Hayes is an unincorporated village in Stanley County, South Dakota, United States. It is also a part of the Pierre, South Dakota Micropolitan Statistical Area and is the operations base for ZIP code 57537.

The community's name honors John and William Hayes, early settlers.

References

Unincorporated communities in Stanley County, South Dakota
Pierre, South Dakota micropolitan area
Unincorporated communities in South Dakota